Rabbi Meir Brandsdorfer (7 September 1934 – 13 May 2009) was a member of the Rabbinical Court of the Edah HaChareidis, the Haredi Ashkenazi community in Jerusalem, and was in charge of their Kashrut operations, especially matters of Shechita.

He was an acclaimed mohel. His responsa have been published under the title Knei Bosem.

Biography
He was born on 7 September 1934, in Antwerp, Belgium, to his parents, Shlomo and Frumit. After surviving World War II while hiding out in France, he moved to Palestine, together with his family.

He became the rabbinical leader of the Toldos Aharon Hasidic movement, based in the Jerusalem neighborhood of Meah Shearim. When Toldos Aharon's previous rebbe died, he joined the split-off group named Toldos Avraham Yitzchok. He was highly respected and eulogized by both groups upon his death.

The position of rabbinical leader in a Hasidic dynasty is not identical to that of rebbe: The rebbe is the spiritual leader, while the rabbinical leader - rabbi - is the halachic expert, who leads the group in questions of Jewish law. While in some Hasidic groups, the rebbe also fulfills the position of rabbinical leader, in other groups, this position is separate.

Brandsdorfer died suddenly at his home in Jerusalem on 13 May 2009, at the age of 74, from cardiovascular disease, and was buried on the Mount of Olives, near the grave of the rebbe of Toldos Aharon.

His maternal grandfather was R. Yissachar Shlomo Teichtal, author of Eim HaBanim Semeicha.

References

External links
 Pictures of funeral procession, attended by thousands

Works
 Knei Bosem Volume 1
 Knei Bosem Volume 2
 Knei Bosem Volume 3
 Knei Bosem Niddah Volume 1
 Knei Bosem Niddah Volume 2

1934 births
2009 deaths
20th-century Belgian Jews
Belgian Ashkenazi Jews
Hasidic rabbis in Israel
Rabbis of the Edah HaChareidis
Belgian Orthodox rabbis
Hasidic rabbis in Europe
Belgian emigrants to Israel
Clergy from Antwerp
Burials at the Jewish cemetery on the Mount of Olives
Mohels
Israeli Hasidic rabbis